Siphona setosa is a Palearctic species of fly in the family Tachinidae.

Distribution
It is found in Europe and Russia.

Hosts
Eupithecia succenturiata, Allophyes oxyacanthae.

References

Tachininae
Diptera of Europe
Insects described in 1960